Six-time defending champions Martina Navratilova and Pam Shriver successfully defended their title, defeating Patty Fendick and Jill Hetherington in the final, 3–6, 6–3, 6–2 to win the women's doubles tennis title at the 1989 Australian Open.

Seeds
Champion seeds are indicated in bold text while text in italics indicates the round in which those seeds were eliminated.

Draw

Finals

Top half

Section 1

Section 2

Bottom half

Section 3

Section 4

External links
 1989 Australian Open – Women's draws and results at the International Tennis Federation

Women's Doubles
1989